= Sulge =

Sulge may refer to:

Sulge (Uchagaon), a village in Belgaum district in the southwestern state of Karnataka, India

Sulge (Yellur), a separate village in Belgaum district in the southwestern state of Karnataka, India
